Miracle Strip at Pier Park was an amusement park in Panama City Beach, Florida, owned by Miracle Strip Carousel, LLC. The original Miracle Strip closed in 2004 after 41 years of operation, but a new amusement park using the same name was resurrected and began with moving the carousel from its original location to Pier Park in March 2009. After the success of the carousel, the few remaining rides were purchased and moved as well, opening in March 2010. This retro park reopened with a few new rides, games and food vendors on a much larger 14-acre tract on April 18, 2014. The park closed in 2015. Many of the rides permanently moved to Lake Winnepesaukah.

This site is now occupied by "Swampy Jack's Wongo Adventure".

Rides
The newly built Miracle Strip Amusement Park reopened at Pier Park about 200 feet away from its original 2009 opening location in the center of Pier Park. The new location had its grand opening on April 19, 2014. The new property held about 14 acres of land filled with many attractions and rides. The ride list is as follows:
 1964 Allen Herschell Carousel
 1985 Zamperla Balloon Race
 1975 Eli Bridge Ferris Wheel 
 1952 Allen Herschell Red Baron
 1975 Eli Bridge Scrambler
 1991 Sellner Tilt-a-Whirl
 1980 Chance Sea Dragon
 1949 Allen Herschell Car Ride
 1969 Allen Herschell Boat Ride
 1978 Zamperla Tea Cups
 1937 Jolly Caterpillar
 1969 Swing Sharks
 1966 Chance Trabant
 1975 Eyerly Rock O Planes
 1968 Eyerly Bullet
 1970 SDC Galaxi Coaster (RipTide)
 1966 Floyd & Baxter Bumper Cars
 Kiddie Bumper Boats
 Kiddie Trackless Train
 Double Zipline

Along with these rides, there were other various activities such as batting cages, a Butterfly Pavilion, remote-control tug boats, and a Rainbow Umbrella Bridge.

References

Defunct amusement parks in Florida
Amusement parks in Florida
2010 establishments in Florida
Tourist attractions in Bay County, Florida
Buildings and structures in Bay County, Florida
2015 disestablishments in Florida
Amusement parks opened in 2010
Amusement parks closed in 2015